Schinus is a genus of flowering trees and tall shrubs in the sumac family, Anacardiaceae. Members of the genus are commonly known as pepper trees. The Peruvian pepper tree (Schinus molle) is the source of the spice known as pink peppercorn. Some species (e.g. Schinus terebinthifolia) have become an invasive species outside their natural habitats. Schinus polygama, although less well known, is also potentially weedy in mesic areas.

Etymology

The generic name is derived from the Greek word for Pistacia lentiscus, Σχίνος (schinos), which it resembles. Considerable historic confusion has existed as to the correct gender of the genus name; as of 2015, this has been resolved with the determination that the correct gender of Schinus is feminine (rather than masculine), and adjectival names within the genus must be spelled accordingly.

Taxonomy 
Over time, a fair amount of reclassification has occurred within this genus, and earlier names may incorrectly continue to be used by those unaware of changes, including in some cases government departments and even textbooks. The name Schinus areira remains widespread, in Australia (the peppercorn tree) in particular, but this is now considered to be a variety of Schinus molle (var. areira).

Selected species
Schinus engleri Barkley (Argentina, Brazil, and Uruguay)
Schinus fasciculata (Griseb.) I.M.Johnst.
Schinus latifolia (Gillies ex Lindl.) Engl.
Schinus molle L. (=S. huygan) – Peruvian pepper tree (western South America)
Schinus molle var. areira (L.) DC. (=S. areira)
Schinus molle var. molle
Schinus pearcei Engler (Bolivia, Chile, and Peru)
Schinus polygama (Cav.) Cabrera (=S. dentata, S. dependens) (southern South America)
Schinus terebinthifolia Raddi – Brazilian pepper tree (southeastern Brazil, northern Argentina, and Paraguay)
Schinus terebinthifolia var. acutifolia Engl.
Schinus terebinthifolia var. pohliana Engl.
Schinus terebinthifolia var. raddiana Engl.
Schinus terebinthifolia var. rhoifolia (Mart.) Engl. (=S. aroiera, S. rhoifolia)
Schinus terebinthifolia var. terebinthifolia
Schinus venturi Barkley (Argentina and Bolivia)
Schinus weinmanniifolia Mart. ex Engl.

Formerly placed here
Cuscuta myricoides (L.) Druce (as S. myricoides L.)
Limonia acidissima L. (as S. limonia L.)
Lithraea molleoides (Vell.) Engl. (as S. molleoides Vell.)
Zanthoxylum fagara (L.) Sarg. (as S. fagara L.)

References

 
Anacardiaceae genera